Upper Ngau Tau Kok Estate is one of the 37 constituencies in the Kwun Tong District of Hong Kong which was recreated in 2015.

The constituency loosely covers part of Upper Ngau Tau Kok Estate with the estimated population of 15,165.

Councillors represented

Election results

2010s

References

Constituencies of Hong Kong
Constituencies of Kwun Tong District Council
2015 establishments in Hong Kong
Constituencies established in 2015
Ngau Tau Kok